Distichopora is a genus of hydrozoans belonging to the family Stylasteridae.

The species of this genus are found in Pacific Ocean, Indian Ocean and Central Atlantic Ocean.

Species

Species:

Distichopora anceps 
Distichopora anomala 
Distichopora antigua

References

Stylasteridae
Hydrozoan genera